Khorfulus County is a county in the Eastern Nile of South Sudan. Khorfulus County is the Land of Dinka Padang that comprises Luach, Rut, Thoi and Paweny Dinka. These group of people are pastoralist and practice small scale farming. They border Shilluk to the North, Dinka Ngok to the East and Nuer to the South and West.

References

External links
https://web.archive.org/web/20070929044452/http://www.khorfulus.com/
https://web.archive.org/web/20110708045118/http://www.khorfuluscounty.blogspot.com/
250 demobilized child soldiers trade weapons for textbooks (25 April 2006)

Pastoralists
Counties of Jonglei State